ALBEDO Telecom is a company that designs and manufactures products for the telecom  industry including testers, synchronization nodes and networking devices. Typical users are R&D laboratories, Mobile and Telecom operators to verify and install the infrastructures that support any kind of applications based on voice, video and data. It is headquartered in Barcelona, Spain, in the European Union.

History

ALBEDO was formed by the 2010 by the former owners of ICT electronics.

Market segments 
ALBEDO field testers
There are several lines including hand-held Gigabit Ethernet, Synchronous Ethernet, E1, PDH, SDH, Ethernet, IP, Jitter, Wander, Datacom testers all in a handy battery operated set.

ALBEDO WAN emulators
Handy devices that emulate accurately by hardware links/networks in terms of bandwidth & traffic impairments. Bandwidth control is done by means of Traffic Shaping & Policing while packet impairments are based on delays, loss, jitter, errors and duplications.

ALBEDO lawful interception
These tools are unique and able to Emulate WANs, Filter Traffic, Capture, Storage and Tap by hardware at wire speed in a small, compact and battery operated devices.

ALBEDO synchronization
This market includes PTP and Sync-E testers, WAN emulators to find out the tolerance of the synchronous network under heavy traffic condition and PTP/SybcE network clocks to deliver SyncE and PTP timing services

ALBEDO laboratories
Design of acceptance and inter-connectivity labs to execute interoperability test suites that will ensure the performance of telecom equipment based on xDSL, VoIP, IPTV, C-Ethernet, NG-SDH, EFM, and FTTH.

ALBEDO multimeters
Electronic instruments to measure voltage, current, resistance and isolation. Instruments may include TDR functionalities for massive cable testing.

ALBEDO SLA systems
Solutions based on network probes to verify the quality of Ethernet / IP networks providing multimedia and critical data services.

External links
ALBEDO

Telecommunications equipment
Photonics companies
Technology companies of Spain
Companies based in Barcelona